The Peugeot 406 is a large family car that was produced by French automaker Peugeot between 1995 and 2004. Available in saloon, estate and coupé bodystyles with a choice of petrol or turbodiesel engines, the 406 replaced the Peugeot 405 in Peugeot's lineup, and was itself replaced by the Peugeot 407. It used the same platform as the Citroën Xantia, though without that car's sophisticated hydropneumatic suspension system.

The project
The styling of the 406 is heavily influenced by its predecessor, the 405, which began to be phased out from the 406's launch in September 1995, and eventually finished production in Europe in 1997, when the last estate models were discontinued. United Kingdom sales of the 406 began in February 1996.

Initially, the car was available with 1.8 L and 2.0 L petrol and 1.9 L turbodiesel engines, followed by a turbocharged 2.0 petrol, 2.9 (2946 cc, badged as a 3.0) V6 petrol, and 110 bhp 2.1 L turbodiesel. The diesel versions were very popular, and the 406 became one of Europe's best selling diesel powered cars.

The two door coupé, launched at the 1996 Paris Motor Show, was both designed and manufactured by Italian design studio Pininfarina, with choices of a 2.0 L four cylinder engine or a 3.0 L V6, and from 2001, a 2.2 L HDi diesel engine. On later models, a 2.2 L petrol engine was available. A total of 107,633 coupés were made.

The design was originally offered to Fiat by Pininfarina in about 1990, only for Fiat to reject the design and design its own coupe.

For its final year on sale in the United Kingdom, the model was simply called the Peugeot Coupé, with the 406 branding dropped from the name. The 406 was notably successful in the United Kingdom, having broken into the country's key fleet sales market, with a high percentage of units becoming company cars and taxis.

In August 2002, a Peugeot 406 HDi set the world record for the longest distance driven on a single tank of fuel. The car travelled across Australia between Melbourne to Rockhampton, with a total distance of 2,348 km. Knock-down kit versions of the car were also built at the Yontrakit Industrial Factory in Lad Krabang, Bangkok, Thailand.

Engines

Facelift

The facelifted 406 saloon was introduced in February 1999 and safety, strength and speed enhancements resulted in improved Euro NCAP performance. Where the old 406 had one star and a struck off star, the post facelift models gained three stars.

The changes included the new and improved EW/DW Engine Family HDI with greater power, torque and fuel efficiency along with increased refinement, making it comparatively quiet for a diesel. A downside was an increase in the car's insurance group from 9 to 12.

The exterior look was amended as the 406 featured more pronounced ribs, clear headlights, chrome trim and a new honeycomb grille. The rear lights were finished in red with a strip of the car's paint colour across the centre.

The interior was also redesigned to improve comfort and space. New equipment included automated digital climate control/air conditioning on most models except the most basic and a multi function display for warning messages, trip computer, radio and external temperature. There was a more extensive use of wooden trim, better quality plastics, including soft touch plastics, and in addition some models received electrically folding mirrors, with automatic headlights and wipers.

The top of the range Executive model was specified a ten speaker JBL sound system, electrically adjusted and heated leather seats, a memory position for the seats and mirrors, headlight washer jets, a rear sun blind, thicker carpeting, lights in the sun visors, satellite navigation and ambient lighting.

The Coupé received an interior facelift in April 1999 (new dashboard, steering wheel), followed by an exterior facelift four years later (bigger grill).

Awards
The 406 was awarded 1997 What Car? Car of the Year, as well as 1997 and 2001 Caravan Club Towcar of the Year. It was also awarded Semperit Irish Car of the Year for 1997, however, it lost out by a narrow margin of 15 points in the 1996 European Car of the Year award to the Fiat Bravo/Brava.

Motorsport

Laurent Aïello won the 1997 ADAC Deutsche Super Touren Wagen-Cup driving a Peugeot 406 for Peugeot Esso. The 406 was also used in the British Touring Car Championship between 1996 and 2004.

References

External links

Peugeot's official website with pictures of concept cars. (French language)
Replica Build of Taxi 406 Movie car from Taxi films. (English Language)

406
Euro NCAP large family cars
Front-wheel-drive vehicles
Mid-size cars
Police vehicles
Sports sedans
Station wagons
Coupés
Cars introduced in 1995
2000s cars
Touring cars
Pininfarina